Mark Daoud is a Lebanese professional rugby league footballer who has played for the Parramatta Eels in the New South Wales Cup.  

Daoud also played 1 match for The North Sydney Bears in The NSW Cup.  Daoud currently plays for The Asquith Magpies.

Personal life
As of 2021, Daoud is dating Angelique Klimis, Manager of Coogee Diggers Gym.

References

Living people
Asquith Magpies players
Australian people of Lebanese descent
Sportspeople of Lebanese descent
Lebanese rugby league players
Lebanon national rugby league team players
North Sydney Bears NSW Cup players
Year of birth missing (living people)